Epictia albipuncta is a species of snake in the family Leptotyphlopidae. The species is endemic to South America.

Geographic range
E. albipuncta is found in Argentina, Bolivia, southwestern Brazil, Paraguay, Uruguay, and possibly southern Peru.

Habitat
The preferred natural habitats of E. albipuncta are grassland, shrubland, savanna, and forest.

Reproduction
E. albipuncta is oviparous.

Etymology
The specific name, weyrauchi (of the synonym Leptotyphlops weyrauchi), is in honor of German-Peruvian malacologist Wolfgang Karl Weyrauch.

References

Further reading
Adalsteinson SA, Branch WR, Trape S, Vitt LJ, Hedges SB (2009). "Molecular phylogeny, classification, and biogeography of snakes of the family Leptotyphlopidae (Reptilia, Squamata)". Zootaxa 2244: 1–50. (Epictia albipuncta, new combination).
Burmeister H (1861). Reise durch die La Plata-Staaten, mit besonderer Rücksicht auf die physische Beschaffenheit und den Culturzustand der Argentinischen  Republik. Ausgrführt in den Jahren 1857, 1858, 1859 und 1860. Zweiter Bande [Volume Two]. Die nordwestlichen Provinzen und die Cordilleren zwischen Catamarca und Copiapó umfassend. Nebst einer systematischen Uebersicht der beobachteten Rückgratthiere. Mit einer Charte bereisten Gegenden. Halle, Germany: H.W. Schmidt. v + 538 pp. (Stenostoma albifrons var. albipuncta, new variety, pp. 527–528). (in German).
Freiberg M (1982). Snakes of South America. Hong Kong: T.F.H. Publications. 189 pp. . (Leptotyphlops albipuncta, p. 117; L. weyrauchi, p. 118 + two photographs on p. 6).
Kretzschmar S (2006). "Revisión histórica y redescripción de Leptotyphlops albipunctus (Serpentes: Leptotyphlopidae)". Cuadernos de Herpetologia 19: 43–56. (in Spanish).
Orejas-Miranda BR (1964). "Dos nuevos Leptotyphlopidae de Sur America". Comunicaciones Zoológicas del Museo de Historia Natural de Montevideo 8: 1–7. (Leptotyphlops weyrauchi, new species). (in Spanish).

Epictia
Reptiles described in 1861